The China women's national under-16 and under-17 basketball team is a national basketball team of China and is governed by the Basketball Association of the People's Republic of China. 

It represents the country in international under-16 and under-17 (under age 16 and under age 17) women's basketball competitions.

See also
China women's national basketball team
China women's national under-19 basketball team
China men's national under-17 basketball team

References

External links
 Archived records of China team participations

under
Women's national under-17 basketball teams